Bernard "Hap" Kliban (January 1, 1935 – August 12, 1990) was an American cartoonist.

Early life and education
Born in Norwalk, Connecticut, Kliban studied at the Pratt Institute and Cooper Union  but "flunked out".  He spent time painting and traveling in Europe before moving to California, where he lived in the North Beach section of San Francisco. He did freelance advertising illustration, drawing ads, logos and annual reports.  His first wife, Mary Kathleen Brown, was a noted cartoonist in her own right as M. K. Brown and chose many of the cartoons that appeared in his publications. It was while living in North Beach that "Hap" (for his birthday, "Happy New Year") began to draw cartoons for Playboy magazine. The income from Playboy provided financial security that enabled him  in 1967 to move Brown and his daughter Kalia to the suburb of Fairfax, Marin County.

Career
In 1962, Kliban became a Playboy cartoonist, contributing cartoons until his death. Michelle Urry, Playboy'''s cartoon editor, visiting his studio, reviewed his drawings, mostly cats. She thought they should be compiled into a book, introduced him to an agent, who found a publisher, resulting in the 1975 book Cat. This led to several other books of cartoons ending with Advanced Cartooning in 1993. Since Cat, his cartoons have adorned many products including stickers, calendars, mugs, and t-shirts.

The books that followed Cat consisted mostly of extremely bizarre cartoons that find their humor in their utter strangeness and unlikeliness. Many of these are cartoons that Kliban drew for Playboy. They often contained dysmorphic drawings of nude figures in extremely unlikely environments. Another frequent subject of satire was the type of wordless, step-by-step visual instruction manuals typically found with such things as office furniture. Kliban also had a recurring series of drawings called "Sheer Poetry", in which the page would be split into six panels, containing images of objects whose names, when spoken in the order presented, would form a rhyming, nonsensical verse.

Kliban drew the album cover for the David Bromberg Band's 1977 LP Reckless Abandon.

Death and legacy
Bernard Kliban died at UCSF Medical Center aged 55 of a pulmonary embolism; he had undergone heart surgery there two weeks previously. He was survived by his second wife, Judith Kamman Kliban (who married actor Bill Bixby shortly before Bixby's death in 1993); brother, Ken, of New York City; and two daughters: Kalia, from his first marriage; and Sarah, from another relationship.

Gary Larson, cartoonist of The Far Side comic strip, named Kliban as one of the inspirations for his work.

Publications
 Books Cat, 1975 ( (pb),  (hb))Never Eat Anything Bigger Than Your Head and Other Drawings, 1976Whack Your Porcupine and Other Drawings, 1977Tiny Footprints, 1978Playboy's Kliban, 1979Playboy's New Kliban, 1980Catcalendar Cats: The Complete Collection, 1981Two Guys Fooling Around with the Moon, 1982Luminous Animals and Other Drawings, 1983The Biggest Tongue in Tunisia and Other Drawings, 1986Advanced Cartooning, 1993

 Comic books 
 

 Posters 
 March 5, 1967 – Benefit for Newstage and Straight Theater: Moby Grape, Big Brother and the Holding Company, Country Joe & the Fish, The Sparrows at Avalon Ballroom''.

References

External links

 Kliban Cats official site
 
 1978 audio interview of B. Kliban by Stephen Banker

1935 births
1990 deaths
American cartoonists
Artists from Connecticut
Artists from the San Francisco Bay Area
Cat artists
Deaths from pulmonary embolism
People from Fairfax, California
People from Norwalk, Connecticut
Playboy cartoonists
Pratt Institute alumni